Shrink is an American comedy series on the Seeso comedy subscription streaming service created by Tim Baltz and Ted Tremper. The story revolves around David Tracey (Baltz), a medical student who has lost his residency and has over half a million dollars in school debt. He discovers that he can become a clinical therapist if he performs 1,920 hours of supervised therapy, and he begins seeing patients for free in his parents' garage.

Cast
 Tim Baltz as David Tracey
 Sue Gillan as Sue
 Mary Holland as Rachel
 Hans Holsen as Doug
 Kyle More as Barry
 Joel Murray as Rollie
 Meagen Fay as Renetta

Episodes

Availability
Shrink is available to watch in the United States on the Peacock streaming services.

References

External links

 

2010s American comedy television series
2017 American television series debuts
2017 American television series endings
Single-camera television sitcoms
English-language television shows
Improvisational television series
Seeso original programming
Television shows set in Illinois